15017 Cuppy, provisional designation , is a Florian asteroid from the inner regions of the asteroid belt, approximately 2 kilometers in diameter. It was discovered on 22 September 1998, by the Lowell Observatory Near-Earth-Object Search (LONEOS) at its Anderson Mesa Station, Arizona, United States. The asteroid was named for American humorist Will Cuppy.

Orbit and classification 

Cuppy orbits the Sun in the inner main-belt at a distance of 2.0–2.7 AU once every 3 years and 7 months (1,296 days). Its orbit has an eccentricity of 0.16 and an inclination of 6° with respect to the ecliptic. The body's observation arc begins 7 years prior to its official discovery observation, with a precovery taken at Palomar Observatory in October 1991.

Physical characteristics 

According to the survey carried out by the NEOWISE mission of NASA's Wide-field Infrared Survey Explorer, Cuppy measures 1.8 kilometers in diameter and its surface has an albedo of 0.50. This is in line with a generic absolute magnitude-to-diameter conversion, which gives a diameter of approximately 2 kilometers for an absolute magnitude of 15.6 and an assumed albedo of 0.2 to 0.25, which is typical for stony asteroids of the inner asteroid belt. As of 2017, Cuppys composition, rotation period and shape remain unknown.

Naming 

This minor planet was named in memory of American literary critic and humorist, Will Cuppy (1884–1949). He is known for his satirical books The Decline and Fall of Practically Everybody, How to Attract the Wombat, How to Become Extinct and How to Tell Your Friends from the Apes. The name was proposed by M. Walter. The approved naming citation was published by the Minor Planet Center on 10 September 2003.

References

External links 

 Photographic observations of 15017 Cuppy, Las Cumbres Observatory Global Telescope Network
 Asteroid Lightcurve Database (LCDB), query form (info )
 Dictionary of Minor Planet Names, Google books
 Asteroids and comets rotation curves, CdR – Observatoire de Genève, Raoul Behrend
 Discovery Circumstances: Numbered Minor Planets (15001)-(20000) – Minor Planet Center
 
 

015017
015017
Named minor planets
19980922